Era Renifera is second studio album by Polish singer Reni Jusis. Musically it's a mixture of many genres just like Jusis previous record Zakręcona. Elements of reggae can also be heard. Two covers were recorded: Lech Janerka's "Konstytucje" and 10 CC's"Dreadlock holiday".

Era Renifera was nominated to Pop Album of The Year (Album Roku Pop) and Video of the Year (Teledysk Roku) "W głowie woda" on Fryderyki Awards.

Track listing

Intro
W głowie woda
Miej oczy otwarte
Konstytucje
O.W.Mewa
To lubię
Dreadlock holiday
Śpiew syReni
Kombinacje
Komunikat
Uciekaj - buzi, buzi
Przepraszam bardzo
Oda do telewizora
Idzie Reni
To już przesada
Era Renifera
Peace & Love

Singles

Dreadlock holiday
W głowie woda
Uciekaj - buzi, buzi
Miej oczy otwarte

1999 albums
Reni Jusis albums